Fellows of the Royal Asiatic Society of Great Britain and Ireland are individuals who have been elected by the Council of the Royal Asiatic Society to further "the investigation of subjects connected with and for the encouragement of science literature and the arts in relation to Asia".

The Society has around 700 fellows, half of whom reside outside Britain. It is administered by a council of twenty fellows. The Society was established in 1823 and became "the main centre in Britain for scholarly work on Asia" with "many distinguished Fellows". Fellows use the post-nominal letters FRAS.

Past and current fellows include leading scholars, writers, and former politicians and governors who have made significant contributions to Asia and their respective fields. Previous Fellows have included British explorers Sir Richard Francis Burton, and Laurence Waddell, Officers of the British East India Company such as Sir Henry Rawlinson, Chief Justice of Ceylon Alexander Johnston, first Asian Nobel laureate Rabindranath Tagore, and many more.

Eligibility
Fellows can be nominated by an existing Fellow, or they can submit an application for fellowship; applications are open to "anyone with a serious interest in Asian Studies", considered regularly, and processed within two months. Students are also eligible to become Student Fellows if they are enrolled in an established course of education.

Notable fellows
 Sir Jehangir Hormasji Kothari
 Henry Thomas Colebrooke
 Sir Richard Francis Burton
 Edward Byles Cowell
 Sir Alexander Johnston
 Thomas Manning
 Sir Henry Creswicke Rawlinson
 Brian Houghton Hodgson
 Col. Laurence Waddell
 Sir Gore Ouseley
 Sir George T Staunton
 Sir William Wilson Hunter
 Sir Stamford Raffles
 Raja Ram Mohan Roy
 Sir Syed Ahmed Khan
 Sir Jamsetjee Jejeebhoy
 Sir William Jones
 Sir Aurel Stein
 Sir Wilfred Thesiger
 Rabindranath Tagore
 Siddhartha Paul Tiwari
 Sir Jadunath Sarkar
 Diwan Bahadur S. Krishnaswami Aiyangar
 Sir Richard O. Winstedt
 Professor Ahmad Hasan Dani
 Arthur John Arberry
 Ahmad Zaki Pasha 
 Prof. Johann Georg Bühler
 Prof. David Marshall Lang
 Prof. Anthony Stockwell
 Elizabeth Anne McCaul Finn
 Prof. George V. Tsereteli
 Prof. Satyabrata Rai Chowdhuri
 Prof. Francis Robinson
 Clinton Bennett
 William Lancaster
 Ustad Aashish Khan Debsharma
 Albert Étienne Jean Baptiste Terrien de Lacouperie (d. 1894)
Sushil Kumar De
 Eric Newby
 Jean Berlie 
 Daphne Park
 Mary Boyce 
 William Dalrymple
 Prof. Jamal Malik
 Prof. K M Baharul Islam
 Prof. Dr Tariq Rahman
 Professor Dr William Sweet
 Professor Dr Rahul Peter Das
 Prof. Haroon Khan Sherwani
 Ronald E. Asher
 Edward Jarvis
 Michael Ridley
Dr. Rosie Llewellyn-Jones
 Dr. Anna Suvorova
 Michael Axworthy 
 Deepak Tripathi 
 B. N. Mukherjee 
 J. M. Gullick 
Mark Trollope, third Bishop of Korea
 Bijan Omrani
Souhardya De
 Gordon Corrigan
Terra Han

References

External links
 Royal Asiatic Society
 Description of Royal Asiatic Society
 Helen Wang, "Famous and not-so-famous people associated with the Royal Asiatic Society" in Shailendra Bhandare and Sanjay Garg (eds), Felicitas. Essays in Numismatics, Epigraphy and History in Honour of Joe Cribb, Reesha Books International (Mumbai, 2011) 413–489.

 
Asiatic Society